Acleris ochropterana is a species of moth of the family Tortricidae. It is found in China (Xizang).

The wingspan is about 20 mm. Adults have been recorded on wing in June.

References

Moths described in 1993
ochropterana
Moths of Asia